Yousry Zagloul (born 29 November 1954) is an Egyptian judoka. He competed in the men's lightweight event at the 1984 Summer Olympics.

References

External links
 

1954 births
Living people
Egyptian male judoka
Olympic judoka of Egypt
Judoka at the 1984 Summer Olympics
Place of birth missing (living people)
20th-century Egyptian people
21st-century Egyptian people